The 72nd annual Locarno Festival was held from 7 August to 17 August 2019. The debut feature by Italian director-producer Ginevra Elkann's Magari opened the festival, and Kiyoshi Kurosawa's To the Ends of the Earth was screened as closing film.

Juries

International Competition
 Catherine Breillat (Jury President), French filmmaker, novelist and professor
 Ilse Hughan, Producer (The Netherlands)
 Emiliano Morreale, Film critic (Italy)
 Nahuel Pérez Biscayart, Actor (Argentina)
 Angela Schanelec, Filmmaker (Germany)

Filmmakers of the Present
 Jake Perlin, Producer (USA) 
 Shengze Zhu, Filmmaker & Producer (China) 
 Yolande Zauberman, Filmmaker (France)

Leopards of Tomorrow
 Bi Gan, Filmmaker (China)
 Alice Diop, Filmmaker (France)
 Mike Plante, Short films programmer at Sundance (USA)

Moving Ahead
 Michael Boyce Gillespie, Film theorist and historian (USA)
 Aline Schmid, Producer (Switzerland)
 Eduardo Williams, Filmmaker (Argentina)

Best First Feature Prizes
 Margherita Chiti, Distributor (Italy)
 Frédéric Jaeger, Artistic Director of Berlin Critics’ Week (Germany)
 Jacqueline Lyanga, Festival Director (USA)

Sections

Piazza Grande

International Competition (Concorso internazionale)

Filmmakers of the Present (Concorso Cineasti del presente)

Moving Ahead

Leopards of Tomorrow (Pardi di domani) 
Leopards of Tomorrow is the festival's competitive program for short films, with separate international and Swiss sections.

International Competition (Concorso internazionale)

Swiss Competition (Concorso nazionale)

Awards
The following awards were presented for films shown In Competition:

International Competition
 Golden Leopard: Vitalina Varela by Pedro Costa
 Special Jury Prize: Height of the Wave by Park Jung-bum
 Best Direction Award: Damien Manivel for Isadora's Children
 Best Actor Award: Regis Myrupu for The Fever
 Best Actress Award: Vitalina Varela for Vitalina Varela
 Special Mentions: 
 The Science of Fictions by Yosep Anggi Noen
 Maternal by Maura Delpero
 Swatch First Feature Awards: Nafi’s Father by Mamadou Dia

Filmmakers of the Present
 Golden Leopard - Filmmakers of the Present: Nafi's Father by Mamadou Dia
 Best Emerging Director: Hassen Ferhani for 143 sahara street
 Special Jury Prize: Ivana the Terrible by Ivana Mladenović
 Special Mention: Here for Life by Andrea Luka Zimmerman and Adrian Jackson

Moving Ahead
Moving Ahead Award: The Giverny Document (Single Channel) by Ja'Tovia M. Gary
Special Mentions:
 Those That, at a Distance, Resemble Another by Jessica Sarah Rinland
 Osmosis by Zhou Tao

Leopards of Tomorrow
Pardino d'oro for the Best International Short Film – SRG SSR Prize: Black Sun by Arda Çiltepe
Pardino d'oro for the Best Swiss Short Film – Swiss Life Prize: Mama Rosa by Dejan Barac
Pardino d'argento SSR SRG for the international competition: Umbilical by Danski Tang
Pardino d'argento Swiss Life for the national competition: Silent Storm by Anaïs Moog
Pardi di domani Best Direction Prize: Anton Sazonov for Leave of Absence

References

External links
 

2019 film festivals
2019 festivals in Europe
2019 in Switzerland
Locarno Festival
August 2019 events in Switzerland